The River Solva (Welsh: Afon Solfach) is a small river in Pembrokeshire, Wales. Its source is a few hundred metres southeast of Croesgoch and flows ten miles before reaching Solva Harbour and St Brides Bay. It passes through mainly agricultural grazing land before reaching the small settlement of Middle Mill and finally the village of Solva.

The river is subject to frequent flood warnings and regularly bursts its banks, in particular flooding properties backing onto the river in Lower Solva.

References

Solva